Song Tae-kon (born September 8, 1986) is a Korean professional Go player.

Biography 
Song Tae-kon started learning Go when he was 6. He turned pro when he was 13. He is one of the best young players in South Korea. His biggest moment came in 2003 when he reached the final of Fujitsu Cup losing to Lee Sedol. Became a 4 dan in 2003 after winning the Chunwon title. Song was promoted to 5 dan in 2003 for having been runner up in the Fujitsu Cup. He was promoted to 6 dan after winning the KBS Cup, and then promoted to his current rank of 7 dan for winning the BC Card Cup. All of this happened in 2003.

Titles & runners-up
Ranks No. 10 in total number of titles in Korea.

Notable games
In a 2008 game Song Tae-kon, playing as White, played the famous but exploitable strategy of Mirror Go until the 42nd move against Piao Wenyao.  Wenyao won the game.

References

External links
GoBase Profile
Sensei's Library Profile

1986 births
Living people
South Korean Go players
Yeosan Song clan